Vindrey is a village (selo) in Torbeyevsky District of the Republic of Mordovia, Russia.  In the 1930s, it had a status of urban-type settlement, but was demoted to a rural locality on January 27, 1939.

References

Rural localities in Mordovia
Torbeyevsky District
Spassky Uyezd (Tambov Governorate)